Jewish religious movements, sometimes called "denominations", include different groups within Judaism which have developed among Jews from ancient times. Today, the most prominent divisions are between traditionalist Orthodox movements (including Haredi and Religious Zionist sects); modernist movements such as Conservative, Masorti and Reform Judaism; and secular or  Jews.

The movements differ in their views on various issues. These issues include the level of observance, the methodology for interpreting and understanding Jewish law, biblical authorship, textual criticism, and the nature or role of the messiah (or messianic age). Across these movements, there are marked differences in liturgy, especially in the language in which services are conducted, with the more traditional movements emphasizing Hebrew. The sharpest theological division occurs between Orthodox and non-Orthodox Jews who adhere to other denominations, such that the non-Orthodox movements are sometimes referred to collectively as the "liberal denominations" or "progressive streams".

Terminology 
Some Jews reject the term denomination as a label for different groups and ideologies within Judaism, arguing that the notion of denomination has a specifically Christian resonance that does not translate easily into the Jewish context. However, in recent years the American Jewish Year Book has adopted "denomination", as have many scholars and theologians.

Commonly used terms are movements, as well as denominations, varieties, traditions, groupings, streams, branches, trends, and such. Sometimes, as an option, only three main currents of Judaism (Orthodox, Conservative and Reform) are named traditions, and divisions within them are called movements.

The Jewish groups themselves reject characterization as sects. Sects are traditionally defined as religious subgroups that have broken off from the main body, and this separation usually becomes irreparable over time. Within Judaism, individuals and families often switch affiliation, and individuals are free to marry one another, although the major denominations disagree on who is a Jew. It is not unusual for clergy and Jewish educators trained in one of the liberal denominations to serve in another, and left with no choice, many small Jewish communities combine elements of several movements to achieve a viable level of membership.

Relationships between Jewish religious movements are varied; they are sometimes marked by interdenominational cooperation outside of the realm of halakha (Jewish law), such as the New York Board of Rabbis, and sometimes not. Some of the movements sometimes cooperate by uniting with one another in community federations and in campus organizations such as the Hillel Foundation. Jewish religious denominations are distinct from, but often linked to, Jewish ethnic divisions and Jewish political movements.

Samaritanism 

The Samaritans regard themselves as direct descendants of the tribes of Ephraim and Manasseh in the northern Kingdom of Israel, which was conquered by Assyria in 722 BCE. Modern genetics has suggested some truth to both the claims of the Samaritans and of the Jews in account to the Talmud.

Samaritan Torah preserves a version of the Torah in slightly variant forms. The first historical references to the Samaritans date from the Babylonian Exile. According to the Talmud, Samaritans are to be treated as Jews in matters where their practice agrees with the mainstream but are otherwise to be treated as non-Jews. The Samaritans have dwindled to two communities of about 700 individuals. One such community is located in the Israeli city of Holon, while the other is located near Nablus on Mount Gerizim, in the West Bank.

Today, Samaritans need to officially go through formal conversion to Judaism in order to be considered Jewish. One example is Israeli TV personality Sofi Tsedaka who was brought up Samaritan and converted to Judaism at the age of 18.

Sects in the Second Temple period 

Prior to the destruction of the Second Temple in 70 CE, Jews of the Roman province of Judaea were divided into several movements, sometimes warring among themselves: Pharisees, Sadducees, Essenes, Zealots, and ultimately early Christians. Many historic sources such as Flavius Josephus, the New Testament and the recovered fragments of the Dead Sea Scrolls, attest to the divisions among Jews at this time. Rabbinical writings from later periods, including the Talmud, further attest these ancient schisms.

The main internal struggles during this era were between the Pharisees and the Sadducees, as well as the early Christians, and also the Essenes and Zealots. The Pharisees wanted to maintain the authority and traditions of classical Torah teachings and began the early teachings of the Mishna, maintaining the authority of the Sanhedrin, the supreme Jewish court. According to Josephus, the Sadducees differed from the Pharisees on a number of doctrinal grounds, notably rejecting ideas of life after death. They appear to have dominated the aristocracy and the temple, but their influence over the wider Jewish population was limited. The Essenes preached an ascetic way of life. The Zealots advocated armed rebellion against any foreign power such as Rome. All were at violent logger-heads with each other, leading to the confusion and disunity that ended with the destruction of the Second Temple and the sacking of Jerusalem by Rome. The Jewish Christians were the original Jewish followers of Jesus. The radical interpretation of Moses' Law by Jesus' disciples and their belief he is the Son of God, along with the development of the New Testament, ensured that Christianity and Judaism would become distinctively different religions.

Rabbinic Judaism 

Most streams of modern Judaism developed from the Pharisaic movement, which became known as Rabbinic Judaism (in Hebrew Yahadut Rabanit – יהדות רבנית) with the compilation of the Oral Torah into the Mishna. After the Bar Kokhba revolt and the destruction of the Second Temple the other movements disappeared from the historical record, yet the Sadducees probably kept on existing in a non-organized form for at least several more decades.

Non-Rabbinic Judaism 

Non-Rabbinic Judaism—Sadducees, Nazarenes, Karaite Judaism, Samaritanism, and Haymanot—contrasts with Rabbinic Judaism and does not recognize the Oral Torah as a divine authority nor the rabbinic procedures used to interpret Jewish scripture.

Karaite Judaism 
The tradition of the Qara'im survives in Karaite Judaism, started in the early 9th century when non-rabbinic sages like Benjamin Nahawandi and their followers took the rejection of the Oral Torah by Anan ben David to the new level of seeking the plain meaning of the Tanakh's text. Karaite Jews accept only the Tanakh as divinely inspired, not recognizing the authority that Rabbinites ascribe to basic rabbinic works like the Talmud and the Midrashim.

Ethno-cultural divisions' movements 

Although there are numerous Jewish ethnic communities, there are several that are large enough to be considered predominant. Generally, they do not constitute separate religious branches within Judaism, but rather separate cultural traditions (nuschaot) and rites of prayer (minhagim). Ashkenazi Jews compose about 75% of the world's Jewish population. Sephardi Jews and Mizrahi Jews compose the greatest part of the rest, with about 20% of the world's Jewish population. Israel has two Chief Rabbi—one for the Ashkenazic, another for the Sephardic with Mizrahi Jews. The remaining 5% of Jews are divided among a wide array of small groups (such as the Beta Israel group of Ethiopian Jews who follow the Haymanot branch of Judaism), some of which are nearing extinction as a result of assimilation and intermarriage into surrounding non-Jewish cultures or surrounding Jewish cultures.

The Enlightenment had a tremendous effect on Jewish identity and on ideas about the importance and role of Jewish observance. Due to the geographical distribution and the geopolitical entities affected by the Enlightenment, this philosophical revolution essentially affected only the Ashkenazi community; however, because of the predominance of the Ashkenazi community in Israeli politics and in Jewish leadership worldwide, the effects have been significant for all Jews.

Sephardic and Mizrahi Judaism 

Sephardic Judaism is the practice of Judaism as observed by the Sephardim (Spanish and Portuguese Jews). The Mizrahi Jews (including Maghrebi) are all Oriental Jewry. Some definitions of "Sephardic" also include Mizrahi, many of whom follow the same traditions of worship but have different ethno-cultural traditions. So far as it is peculiar to themselves and not shared with other Jewish groups such as the Ashkenazim (German rite).

Sephardim are primarily the descendants of Jews from the Iberian Peninsula. They may be divided into the families that left in the Expulsion of 1492 and those that remained as crypto-Jews, Marranos and those who left in the following few centuries. In religious parlance, and by many in modern Israel, the term is used in a broader sense to include all Jews of Ottoman or other Asian or African backgrounds (Mizrahi Jews), whether or not they have any historic link to Spain, although some prefer to distinguish between Sephardim proper and Mizraḥi Jews.

Sephardic and Mizrachi Jewish synagogues are generally considered Orthodox or Sephardic Haredim by non-Sephardic Jews, and are primarily run according to the Orthodox tradition, even though many of the congregants may not keep a level of observance on par with traditional Orthodox belief. For example, many congregants will drive to the synagogue on the Shabbat, in violation of halakha, while discreetly entering the synagogue so as not to offend more observant congregants. However, not all Sephardim are Orthodox; among the pioneers of the Reform Judaism movement in the 1820s there was the Sephardic congregation Beth Elohim in Charleston, South Carolina.

Unlike the predominantly Ashkenazic Reform, and Reconstructionist denominations, Sephardic and Mizrahi Jews who are not observant generally believe that Orthodox Judaism's interpretation and legislation of halakha is appropriate, and true to the original philosophy of Judaism. That being said, Sephardic and Mizrachi rabbis tend to hold different, and generally more lenient, positions on halakha than their Ashkenazi counterparts, but since these positions are based on rulings of Talmudic scholars as well as well-documented traditions that can be linked back to well-known codifiers of Jewish law, Ashkenazic and Hasidic Rabbis do not believe that these positions are incorrect, but rather that they are the appropriate interpretation of halakha for Jews of Sephardic and Mizrachi descent.

The Yemenite Jews—the Dor Daim and other movements—use a separate Baladi-rite. The Yemenite and the Aramaic speaking Kurdish Jews are the only communities who maintain the tradition of reading the Torah in the synagogue in both Hebrew and the Aramaic Targum ("translation"). Most non-Yemenite synagogues have a specified person called a Baal Koreh, who reads from the Torah scroll when congregants are called to the Torah scroll for an aliyah. In the Yemenite tradition, each person called to the Torah scroll for an aliyah reads for himself.

The Shas, a religious political party in Israel, represents the interests of the Orthodox/Haredi Sephardim and Mizrahim.

Ashkenazic movements

Hasidic Judaism 

Hasidic Judaism was founded by Israel ben Eliezer (1700–1760), also known as the Baal Shem Tov, whose followers had previously called themselves Freylechn ("happy ones") and now they call themselves Hasidim ("pious, holy ones"). His charismatic disciples attracted many followers among Ashkenazi Jews, and they also established numerous Hasidic groups across Europe. The Baal Shem Tov came at a time when the Jewish masses of Eastern Europe were reeling from the bewilderment and disappointment which were engendered in them by the two notorious Jewish false messiahs, Sabbatai Zevi (1626–1676) and Jacob Frank (1726–1791), and their respective followers. Hasidic Judaism eventually became the way of life for many Jews in Eastern Europe. The Hasidim are organized into independent "courts" or dynasties, each dynasty is headed by its own hereditary spiritual leader-rebbe. Unlike other Ashkenazim, most Hasidim use some variation of Nusach Sefard, a blend of Ashkenazi and Sephardi liturgies, based on the innovations of the Kabbalist Isaac Luria. Neo-Hasidism is a term which refers to trends of interest in the teachings of Kabbalah and Hasidism which are expressed by members of other existing Jewish movements.

Lithuanian (Lita'im) 

In the late 18th century, there was a serious schism between Hasidic and non-Hasidic Jews. European Jews who rejected the Hasidic movement were dubbed Mitnagdim ("opponents") by the followers of the Baal Shem Tov. Lithuania became the centre of this opposition under the leadership of Vilna Gaon (Elijah ben Solomon Zalman), which adopted the epithets Litvishe (Yiddish word), Litvaks (in Slavic) or Lita'im (in Hebrew) those epithets refer to Haredi Jews who are not Hasidim (and not Hardalim or Sephardic Haredim). Since then, all of the Hasidic Jewish groups have been theologically subsumed into mainstream Orthodox Judaism, particularly, Haredi Judaism, but cultural differences persist. The Lithuanian spirituality was mainly incorporated into the Musar movement.

Post-Enlightenment movements 
Late-18th-century Europe, and then the rest of the world, was swept by a group of intellectual, social and political movements that taken together were referred to as the Enlightenment. These movements promoted scientific thinking, free thought, and allowed people to question previously unshaken religious dogmas. The emancipation of the Jews in many European communities, and the Haskalah movement started by Moses Mendelssohn, brought the Enlightenment to the Jewish community.

In response to the challenges of integrating Jewish life with Enlightenment values, German Jews in the early 19th century began to develop the concept of Reform Judaism, adapting Jewish practice to the new conditions of an increasingly urbanized and secular community. Staunch opponents of the Reform movement became known as Orthodox Jews. Later, members of the Reform movement who felt that it was moving away from tradition too quickly formed the Conservative movement. At the same time, the notion "traditional Judaism" includes the Orthodox with Conservative or solely the Orthodox Jews.

Over time, three main movements emerged (Orthodox, Reform and Conservative Judaism).

Orthodoxy 

Orthodox Jews generally see themselves as practicing normative Judaism, rather than belonging to a particular movement. Within Orthodox Judaism, there is a spectrum of communities and practices, ranging from ultra-Orthodox Haredi Judaism (Haredim) and Jewish fundamentalism to Modern Orthodox Judaism (with Neo-Orthodoxy, Open Orthodoxy, and Religious Zionism). Orthodox Jews who opposed the Haskalah became known as Haredi Jews (Haredim). Orthodox Jews who were sympathetic to the Haskalah formed what became known as neo-Orthodox or modern Orthodox Jews. The father of neo-Orthodoxy was the influenced German rabbi Samson Raphael Hirsch, who proclaimed principle Torah im Derech Eretz—the strict observance of the Jewish Law in an active social life—in 1851, he become the rabbi of first Orthodox separatist group from Reform community of Frankfurt am Main. In addition, the "Centrist" Orthodoxy was represented by American rabbi Joseph B. Soloveitchik affiliated with the Orthodox Union.

In Israel, Orthodox Judaism occupies a privileged position: solely an Orthodox rabbi may become the Chief rabbi and Chief military rabbi; and only Orthodox synagogues have the right to conduct Jewish marriages.

Reform 

Reform Judaism, also known as Liberal or Progressive Judaism, originally began in Germany, the Netherlands and the United States circa 1820 as a reaction to modernity, stresses assimilation and integration with society and a personal interpretation of the Torah. The German rabbi and scholar Abraham Geiger with principles of Judaism as religion and not ethnicity, progressive revelation, historical-critical approach, the centrality of the Prophetic books, and superiority of ethical aspects to the ceremonial ones has become the main ideologist of the "Classical" Reform.

Conservative (Masorti) 

Conservative or Masorti Judaism, originated in Germany in the 19th century, but became institutionalized in the United States, where it was to become the largest Jewish movement. After the division between Reform and Orthodox Judaism, the Conservative movement tried to provide Jews seeking liberalization of Orthodox theology and practice with a more traditional and halakhically-based alternative to Reform Judaism. It has spread to Ashkenazi communities in Anglophone countries and Israel.

Neolog Judaism, a movement in the Kingdom of Hungary and in its territories ceded in 1920, is similar to the more traditional branch of American Conservative Judaism.

Migration 
The particular forms which the denominations have taken on have been shaped by immigration of the Ashkenazi Jewish communities, once concentrated in eastern and central Europe, to western and mostly Anglophone countries (in particular, in North America). In the middle of the 20th century, the institutional division of North American Jewry between Reform, Conservative, and Orthodox movements still reflected immigrant origins. Reform Jews at that time were predominantly of German or western European origin, while both Conservative and Orthodox Judaism came primarily from eastern European countries.

Zionists (Datim) and anti-Zionists 

The issue of Zionism was once very divisive in the Jewish community. Religious Zionism combines Zionism and Orthodox Judaism, based on the teachings of rabbis Zvi Hirsch Kalischer and Abraham Isaac Kook. The name Hardalim ("Nationalist Haredim") refers to the Haredi-oriented variety of Religious Zionism. Another mode is Reform Zionism as Zionist arm of Reform Judaism.

Religious Zionists (datim) have embraced the Zionist movement, including Religious Kibbutz Movement, as part of the divine plan to bring or speed up the messianic era.

Ultra-Orthodox Jewish non-Zionists believed that the return to Israel could only happen with the coming of the Messiah, and that a political attempt to re-establish a Jewish state through human means alone was contrary to God's plan. Non-Zionists believed that Jews should integrate into the countries in which they lived, rather than moving to the Land of Israel. The original founders of Reform Judaism in Germany rejected traditional prayers for the restoration of Jerusalem. The view among Reform Jews that Judaism was strictly a religion rather than a nation with cultural identity, and that Jews should be assimilated, loyal citizens of their host nations, led to a non-Zionist, and sometimes anti-Zionist, stance. After events of the 20th century, most importantly the Holocaust and the establishment of the modern State of Israel, opposition to Zionism largely disappeared within Reform Judaism.

Among most religious non-Zionists, such as Chabad, there is a de facto recognition of Israel, but only as a secular non-religious state.

A few of the fringe groups of the anti-Zionists, with marginal ideology, does not recognize the legitimacy of the Israeli state. Among them are both the Orthodox (the Satmar Hasidism, Edah HaChareidis, Neturei Karta) and Reform (American Council for Judaism).

Pressures of assimilation 

Among the most striking differences between the Jewish movements in the 21st century is their response to pressures of assimilation, such as intermarriage between Jews and non-Jews. Reform and Reconstructionist rabbis have been most accepting of intermarried couples, with some rabbis willing to officiate in mixed religious ceremonies, although most insist that children in such families be raised strictly Jewish. Conservative rabbis are not permitted to officiate in such marriages, but are supportive of couples when the non-Jewish partner wishes to convert to Judaism and raise children as Jewish.

Beta Israel (Haymanot) 

The Beta Israel (House of Israel), also known as Ethiopian Jews, are a Jewish community that developed in Ethiopia and lived there for centuries. Most of the Beta Israel emigrated to Israel in the late 20th century. They practiced Haymanot, a religion which is generally recognized as a non-Rabbinic form of Judaism (in Israel, they practice a mixture of Haymanot and Rabbinic Judaism). To the Beta Israel, the holiest book is the Orit (a word which means the "law"), and it consists of the Torah and the Books  of Joshua, Judges and Ruth. Until the middle of the 20th century, the Beta Israel of Ethiopia were the only modern Jewish group which practiced a monastic tradition which the monks adhered to by living in monasteries which were separated from the Jewish villages.

Crypto-Judaism 

The secret adherence to Judaism while publicly professing to be of another faith; practitioners are referred to as "crypto-Jews" (origin from Greek kryptos – κρυπτός, 'hidden').

In the United States, Reform rabbi Jacques Cukierkorn is one of the leaders of the outreach to the descendants of those Crypto-Jews who wish to renew their ties with the Jewish people.

Other ethnic movements

Crimean Karaites 

The Crimean Karaites ( Karaims) are an ethnicity which is derived from Turkic Karaim-speaking adherents of Karaite Judaism in Eastern Europe, especially in Crimea. They were probably Jewish by origin, but due to political pressure and other reasons, many of them began to claim that they were Turks, descendants of the Khazars. During the era when Crimea was a part of the Russian Empire, the Crimean Karaite leaders persuaded the Russian rulers to exempt Karaites from the anti-Semitic regulations which were imposed upon Jews. These Karaites were recognized as non-Jews during the Nazi occupation. Some of them even served in the SS. The ideology of de-Judaization and the revival of Tengrism were imbued with the works of the contemporary leaders of the Karaites in Crimea. While the members of several Karaite congregations were registered as Turks, some of them retained Jewish customs. In the 1990s, many Karaites emigrated to Israel, under the Law of Return. The largest Karaite community has since then resided in Israel.

Igbo Jews 

Igbo people of Nigeria who practice a form of Judaism. Judaism has been documented in parts of Nigeria since the precolonial period, from as early as the 1500s, but is not known to have been practiced in the Igbo region in precolonial times. Nowadays, up to 30,000 Igbos are practicing some form of Judaism.

Subbotniks 

The Subbotniks are a movement of Jews of Russian ethnic origin which split off from other Sabbatarians in the late 18th century. The majority of the Subbotniks practiced Rabbinic and Karaite Judaism, a minority of them practiced Spiritual Christianity. Subbotnik families settled in the Holy Land which was then a part of the Ottoman Empire, in the 1880s, as part of the Zionist First Aliyah in order to escape oppression in the Russian Empire and later, most of them married other Jews. Their descendants included Israeli Jews such as Alexander Zaïd, Major-General Alik Ron, and the mother of Ariel Sharon.

20th/21st-century movements

20th-century movements 
Additionally, a number of smaller groups have emerged:
 Black Judaism

A type of Judaism that is predominantly practiced in African communities, both inside and outside Africa (such as North America). It is theologically characterized by the selective acceptance of the Judaic faith (in some cases, such selective acceptance has historical circumstances), and the belief system of Black Judaism is significantly different from the belief system of the mainstream movements of Judaism. In addition, although Black Judaic communities adopt Judaic practices such as the celebration of Jewish holidays and the recital of Jewish prayers, some of them are generally not considered legitimate Jews by mainstream Jewish societies.
 Jewish Science
Formed in the early 20th century by Alfred G. Moses and Morris Lichtenstein, Jewish Science was founded as a counterweight Jewish movement to Christian Science. Jewish Science sees God as a force or energy penetrating the reality of the Universe and emphasis is placed upon the role of affirmative prayer in personal healing and spiritual growth. The Society of Jewish Science in New York is the institutional arm of the movement regularly publishing The Interpreter, the movement's primary literary publication.
 Reconstructionist Judaism

Founded by rabbi Mordecai Kaplan, a split from Conservative Judaism that views Judaism as a progressively evolving civilization with focus on Jewish community. The central organization is "Reconstructing Judaism". Assessments of its impact range from being recognized as the 4th major stream of Judaism to described as a smaller movement.
 Humanistic Judaism
A nontheistic worldwide movement that emphasizes Jewish culture and history as the sources of Jewish identity. Originated in Detroit in 1965 with the founding figure, Reform rabbi Sherwin Wine, in 1969 was established the Society for Humanistic Judaism.
 Carlebach movement
The neo-Hasidic movement inspired by the counterculture of the 1960s and founded in the late 1960s in San Francisco (where opened the House of Love and Prayer), then in Israel, by a musician, Lubavich's Hasidic rabbi Shlomo Carlebach for the return of secular youth to the bosom of Orthodox Judaism. The movement has no organisational agenda and promotes Carlebach minyan, a song-filled form of Jewish worship.
 Jewish Renewal
Partly syncretistic movement founded in the mid-1970s by ex-Lubavich's Hasidic rabbi Zalman Schachter-Shalomi and  rooted in the counterculture of the 1960s and the Havurat Shalom group. The "Bnei ʻOr" (Songs of Light) in Philadelphia—the first Renewal community—later was established the ambrella organisation "ALEPH: the Alliance for Jewish Renewal". Its syncretism includes Kabbalah, neo-Hasidism, Reconstructionist Judaism, Western Buddhist meditation, Sufism, New Age, feminism, liberalism, and so on, tends to embrace the ecstatic worship style. Renewal congregations tend to be inclusive on the subject of who is a Jew and had avoided affiliation with any Jewish communities.
 Conservadox
The term occasionally applied to describe either individuals or new congregations, aspecially established by rabbi David Weiss Halivni in 1984 in US Union for Traditional Judaism, located between the Conservative and Modern Orthodox. While most scholars consider "Union for Traditional Judaism" (formerly Union for Traditional Conservative Judaism) as a new movement, some attribute it to the right wing of Conservative Judaism.
 Kabbalah Centre
A New Age worldwide organisation established in 1984 by American rabbi Philip Berg, that popularizes Jewish mysticism among a universal audience.
 Lev Tahor
A Haredi sect formed in the 1980s by Israeli-Canadian rabbi Shlomo Helbrans, follows a strict version of halakha, including its own unique practices such as lengthy prayer sessions, arranged marriages between teenagers, and head-to-toe coverings for females.
 Open Orthodoxy
A movement founded by Avi Weiss in the late 1990s in US, with its own schools for religious ordination, both for men (Yeshivat Chovevei Torah) and women (Yeshivat Maharat). The movement declarates liberal, or inclusive Orthodoxy with women's ordination, full accepting LGBT members, and reducing stringent rules for conversion.
 Haredi burqa sect 
A controversial ultra-Orthodox group with a Jewish burqa-style covering of a woman's entire body, including a veil covering the face. Also known as the "Taliban Women" and the "Taliban Mothers" (נשות הטאליבן). 
 Messianic Judaism

Made up of followers who seek to combine parts of Rabbinic Judaism with a belief in Jesus as the Messiah and other Christian beliefs. It is not regarded as Judaism by the major movements of Judaism, and is considered a form of Protestant Christianity. People who had become Messianic Jews as, in fact, Christians were not therefore eligible for Aliyah under the Law of Return. "Scholars are divided as to whether to call Messianic Judaism a Christian or Jewish Sect."

Remark: Baal teshuva movement—a description of the return of secular Jews to religious Judaism and involved with all the Jewish movements.

Trans- and post-denominational Judaism 
The very idea of Jewish denominationalism is contested by some Jews and Jewish non-denominational organisations, which consider themselves to be "trans-denominational" or "post-denominational". The term "trans-denominational" also applied to describe new movements located on the religious continuum between some major streams, as an instance, Conservadox (Union for Traditional Judaism).

A variety of new Jewish organisations are emerging that lack such affiliations:
 Havurah movement is the number of small egalitarian experimental spiritual groups (first in 1960 in California) for prayer as autonomous alternatives to Jewish movements. Most notable of them is the Havurat Shalom in Somerville, Massachusetts;
 Independent minyan movement is a lay-led Jewish worship and study community that has developed independently of established denominational and synagogue structures and combines halakha with egalitarianism;
 International Federation of Rabbis (IFR), a non-denominational rabbinical organization for rabbis of all movements and backgrounds;
 Some Jewish day schools lack affiliation with any one movement;
 There are several seminaries which are not controlled by a denomination (see  and ): 
 Academy for Jewish Religion (California) (AJRCA) is a transdenominational seminary based in Los Angeles, California. It draws faculty and leadership from all denominations of Judaism. It has programs for rabbis, cantors, chaplains, community leadership and Clinical Pastoral Education (CPE); 
 Academy for Jewish Religion (New York) (AJR) is a transdenominational seminary in Yonkers, NY, that trains rabbis and cantors and also offers Master's Program in Jewish Studies; 
 Hebrew College, a seminary in Newton Centre, Massachusetts, near Boston;
 Hebrew Seminary in Skokie, Illinois 
 Other smaller, less traditional institutions include:   
Rabbinical Seminary International, Jewish Spiritual Leaders Institute, Pluralistic Rabbinical Seminary, Rimmon Rabbinical School
Mesifta Adath Wolkowisk aimed at community professionals with significant knowledge and experience.

Organizations such as these believe that the formal divisions that have arisen among the "denominations" in contemporary Jewish history are unnecessarily divisive, as well as religiously and intellectually simplistic. According to Rachel Rosenthal, "the post-denominational Jew refuses to be labeled or categorized in a religion that thrives on stereotypes. He has seen what the institutional branches of Judaism have to offer and believes that a better Judaism can be created." Such Jews might, out of necessity, affiliate with a synagogue associated with a particular movement, but their own personal Jewish ideology is often shaped by a variety of influences from more than one denomination.

Bnei Noah 

Noahidism, Noahides, or Bnei Noah ("Sons of Noah") is a new religious movement which is based upon the Seven Laws of Noah. Historically, the Hebrew term Bnei Noah has been applied to all non-Jews because Jews believe that they are the descendants of Noah. Nowadays, however, it is specifically used to refer to those "Righteous Gentiles" who observe the Seven Laws of Noah. According to Jewish law, non-Jews (Gentiles) are not obligated to convert to Judaism, but they are required to observe the Seven Laws of Noah in order to be assured that they will have a place in the World to Come (Olam Ha-Ba), the final reward of the righteous. The modern Noahide movement was founded in the 1990s by Orthodox rabbis from Israel (mainly tied Hasidic and Zionist).

List of contemporary movements 
Rabbinic Judaism
Orthodox Judaism
Haredi Judaism (ultra-Orthodox)
Hardal
Hasidic Judaism
Hasidic dynasties

Belz
Bobov
Breslov
Na Nach
Chabad-Lubavitch
Ger
Karlin-Stolin
Sanz-Klausenburg
Satmar
Shomer Emunim
Toldos Aharon
Skver
Vizhnitz
Other dynasties
Misnagdim (Lithuanian)
Musar movement
Sephardic Haredim
Yemenite Judaism
Dor Daim
Other Haredim
Edah HaChareidis
Haredi burqa sect
Lev Tahor
Neturei Karta
Modern Orthodoxy
Carlebach movement
Neo-Orthodoxy
Open Orthodoxy
Religious Zionism (Datim)
Religious Kibbutz Movement
Conservadox
Conservative Judaism (Masorti)
Neolog Judaism
Reform Judaism
Reform Zionism
Other Rabbinic
Humanistic Judaism
Jewish Renewal
Reconstructionist Judaism
Non-denominational
Havurah movement
Independent minyan

Non-Rabbinic Judaism
Haymanot
Karaite Judaism
Samaritanism (controversial)

Crypto-Judaism
Anusim
Sephardic Bnei Anusim
Converso
Marrano
Xueta
Beta Abraham
Chala (Jews)
Dönmeh
Kaifeng Jews
Mashhadi Jews
Neofiti

Others
Black Judaism
Subbotniks

Syncretic (controversial)
Jewish Science
Kabbalah Centre
Noahidism

See also 
 Jewish schisms
 Jewish views on religious pluralism
 List of religious organizations#Jewish organizations

Notes

References

Further reading

External links 

 
 Emergence of Jewish Denominations (MyJewishLearning.com)
 Jewish World Today. Overview: State of the Denominations (MyJewishLearning.com)
 Jewing Movements - How Jewish movements will and have evolved

Orthodox/Haredi
 Orthodox Judaism – The Orthodox Union
 Chabad-Lubavitch
 Rohr Jewish Learning Institute
 The Various Types of Orthodox Judaism
 Aish HaTorah
 Ohr Somayach

Traditional/Conservadox
 Union for Traditional Judaism

Conservative
 The United Synagogue of Conservative Judaism
 Masorti (Conservative) Movement in Israel
 United Synagogue Youth

Reform/Progressive
 The Union for Reform Judaism (USA)
 Reform Judaism (UK)
 Liberal Judaism (UK)
 World Union for Progressive Judaism (Israel)

Reconstructionist
 Jewish Reconstructionist Federation

Renewal
 ALEPH: Alliance for Jewish Renewal
 OHALAH Association of Rabbis for Jewish Renewal

Humanistic
 Society for Humanistic Judaism

Karaite
 World Movement for Karaite Judaism

 

Religious denominations